Barry Tannenbaum (born 1966) is a South African businessman who was accused of the largest corporate fraud in South Africa.

Biography
Tannenbaum was born in Johannesburg in 1966.

In 2007, he moved to Sydney.

In 2009, he was accused of running a R10 billion Ponzi scheme in the largest corporate fraud in South Africa. The fraud promised 880 investors returns of 200% per year in investments related to pharmaceutical imports. However, South Africa never issued a formal extradition request.

In February 2015, he was an Uber driver in Runaway Bay, Queensland.

References

South African Jews
South African businesspeople
Living people
1966 births